Category 1 is the lowest classification on the Australian tropical cyclone intensity scale used to classify tropical cyclones, that have 10-minute sustained winds of .  tropical cyclones have peaked as Category 1 tropical cyclones in the South Pacific tropical cyclone basin, which is denoted as the waters surrounding Australia to the south of the equator, between 90°E and 160°E. The earliest tropical cyclone to be classified as a Category 1 tropical cyclone was Carmen. The latest was Harold which was classified as a Category 1 tropical cyclone as it moved through the Solomon Sea.

Background
The Australian region tropical cyclone basin is located to the south of the Equator between 90°E and 160°E. The basin is officially monitored by the Australian Bureau of Meteorology, Papua New Guinea's National Weather Service as well as Indonesia's Badan Meteorologi Klimatologi dan Geofisika. Other meteorological services such as the Fiji Meteorological Service, the New Zealand MetService, Météo-France as well as the United States Joint Typhoon Warning Center also monitor the basin. However, this scale is not officially used in the Australian, however, various agencies including NASA also use it to compare tropical cyclones. A Category 1 tropical cyclone is expected to cause some damage, if it significantly impacts land at or near its peak intensity.

Systems

1970's

|-
| Isa ||  ||  ||  || Solomon Islands || || ||
|-
| Dora ||  ||  ||  || Queensland || Widespread ||  ||
|-
| Fiona ||  ||  ||  || Queensland, New Caledonia || || ||
|-
| Faith ||  ||  ||  || Northern Territory, Queensland || || ||
|-
| Maud ||  ||  ||  || Western Australia || || ||
|-
| Bella ||   ||  ||  || Northern Territory || || ||
|-
| Paula ||  ||  ||  || Northern Territory || || ||
|-
| Natalie ||  ||  ||  || || || ||
|-
| Flora ||  ||  ||  || Northern Territory || || ||
|-
| Amelia (1975) || ||  ||  || Northern Territory || || ||
|-
| Denise ||  ||  ||  || Cocos Island || Minor || None ||
|-
|  Kim (1975)
|-
|  Sue (1975)
|-
|  Alan (1976)
|-
|  Hope (1976)
|-
|  Carol (1976)
|-
|  June (1977)
|-
|  Keith (1977)
|-
|  Lily (1977)
|-
|  Miles (1977)
|-
|  Nancy (1977)
|-
|  Otto (1977)
|-
|  Stan (1979)
|-
|  Gordon (1979)

|}

1980's

|-
| Paul
|-
| Edna ||  ||  ||  || None ||  ||  ||
|-
| Amelia ||  ||  ||  || Northern Territory ||  ||  ||
|-
| 04U ||  ||  ||  || Northern Territory ||  ||  ||
|-
| Coral
|-
| Claudia
|-
| Des
|-
| Fritz
|-
| 06U
|-
| Rebecca ||  ||  ||  || Arnhem Land, Cape York Peninsula ||  ||  ||
|-
| Ophelia
|-
| Hector
|-
| Vernon
|-
| Alfred
|-
| Blanch(e)
|-
| Herbie ||  ||  ||  || Western Australia ||  ||  ||
|-
| John ||  ||  ||  || Cocos Island ||  ||  ||
|-
| Leon –Hanitra ||  ||  ||  || None ||  ||  ||
|-
| Marcia ||  ||  ||  || None ||  ||  ||
|-
| Ernie ||  ||  ||  || Vanuatu, Solomon Islands, Papua New Guniea ||  ||  ||
|}

1990s

|-
| Rosita ||  ||  ||  || None ||  ||  ||
|-
| Greg ||  ||  ||  || None ||  ||  ||
|-
| Bessi ||  ||  ||  || None ||  ||  ||
|-
| Laurence ||  ||  ||  || None ||  ||  ||
|-
| Ken ||  ||  ||  || Cocos Island ||  ||  ||
|-
| Oscar ||  ||  ||  || Northern Territory, Western Australia ||  ||  ||
|-
| Sadie ||  ||  ||  || Cape York ||  ||  ||
|-
| Tim ||  ||  ||  || Christmas Island, Cocos Island ||  ||  ||
|-
| Emma ||  ||  ||  || Christmas Island ||  ||  ||
|-
| Isobel ||  ||  ||  || None ||  ||  ||
|-
| Dennis ||  ||  ||  || Cape York ||  ||  ||
|-
| Lindsay ||  ||  ||  || None ||  ||  ||
|-
| Melanie –Bellamine ||  ||  ||  || None ||  ||  ||
|-
| Nicholas ||  ||  ||  || Western Australia ||  ||  ||
|-
| Gillian ||  ||  ||  || Papua New Guinea, Queensland ||  ||  ||
|-
| Ita ||  ||  ||  || Queensland ||  ||  ||
|-
| Sid ||  ||  ||  || Northern Territory ||  ||  ||
|-
| May ||  ||  ||  || Northern Territory ||  ||  ||
|-
| Zelia ||  ||  ||  || None ||  ||  ||
|-
| Olinda ||  ||  ||  || New Caledonia ||  ||  ||
|}

2000s

|-
| Marcia ||  ||  ||  || None ||  ||  ||
|-
| Winsome ||  ||  ||  || Northern Territory ||  ||  ||
|-
| Wylva ||  ||  ||  || Northern Australia ||  ||  ||
|-
| Errol ||  ||  ||  || None ||  ||  ||
|-
| Upia ||  ||  ||  || Budelun Island ||  ||  ||
|-
| Beni ||  ||  ||  || Queensland, Solomon IslandsVanuatu, New Caledonia ||  ||  ||
|-
| Graham ||  ||  ||  || Western Australia ||  ||  ||
|-
| Harriet ||  ||  ||  || None ||  ||  ||
|-
| Epi ||  ||  ||  || Papua New Guinea ||  ||  ||
|-
| Evan ||  ||  ||  || Northern Australia ||  ||  ||
|-
| Phoebe ||  ||  ||  || None ||  ||  ||
|-
| Raymond ||  ||  ||  || Western Australia, Northern Territory ||  ||  ||
|-
| Tim ||  ||  ||  || None ||  ||  ||
|-
| Vivienne ||  ||  ||  || None ||  ||  ||
|-
| Emma ||  ||  ||  || Western Australia ||  ||  ||
|-
| Pierre ||  ||  ||  || Solomon Islands, Papua New Guinea ||  ||  ||
|-
| 01U/01S ||  ||  ||  || None ||  ||  ||
|-
| Charlotte ||  ||  ||  || Cape York Peninsular ||  ||  ||
|-
| Ellie ||  ||  ||  || Queensland ||  ||  ||
|-
| Freddy ||  ||  ||  || None ||  ||  ||
|-
| Kirrily ||  ||  ||  || Indonesia ||   ||  ||
|}

2010s

|-
| Neville ||  ||  ||  || Queensland ||  ||  ||
|-
| Tasha ||  ||  ||  || Queensland ||  || 1 ||
|-
| Vince ||  ||  ||  || None ||  ||  ||
|-
| 25U/20S ||  ||  ||  || Western Australia ||  ||  ||
|-
| Mitchell ||  ||  ||  || None ||  ||  ||
|-
| Oswald ||  ||  ||  || Eastern Australia ||  ||  ||
|-
| Alessia ||  ||  ||  || Northern Australia ||  ||  ||
|-
| Edna ||  ||  ||  || Queensland, New Caledonia ||  ||  ||
|-
| Hadi ||  ||  ||  || Queensland, Papua New Guinea, Solomon Islands, Vanuatu ||  ||  ||
|-
| Raquel ||  ||  ||  || Solomon Islands ||  ||  ||
|-
| Yvette ||  ||  ||  || Western Australia ||  ||  ||
|-
| Caleb ||  ||  ||  || None ||  ||  ||
|-
| Greg ||  ||  ||  || None ||  ||  ||
|-
| Cempaka ||  ||  ||  || Indonesia ||  ||  ||
|-
| Irving ||  ||  ||  || None ||  ||  ||
|-
| Flamboyan ||  ||  ||  || None ||  ||  ||
|-
| Kenanga ||  ||  ||  || None ||  ||  ||
|-
| Lili ||  ||  ||  || Eastern Indonesia, East Timor, Top End ||  ||  ||
|}

2020s

|-
| Blake ||  ||  ||  || Western Australia ||  ||  ||
|-
| Esther ||  ||  ||  || Northern Australia ||  ||  ||
|-
|  Gretel ||  ||  ||  || Cape York Peninsula, New Caledonia, New Zealand ||  ||  ||
|-
| Harold ||  ||  ||  || Solomon Islands, Vanuatu, Fiji, Tonga ||  ||  ||
|-
| Mangga ||  ||  ||  || Western Australia ||  ||  ||
|-
| Joshua ||  ||  ||  || None ||  ||  ||
|-
| Kimi ||  ||  ||  || Queensland ||  ||  ||
|-
| Odette ||  ||  ||  || Western Australia ||  ||  ||
|-
| Paddy ||  ||  ||  || Christmas Island ||  ||  ||
|-
| Teratai ||  ||  ||  || None ||  ||  ||
|-
| 01U ||  ||  ||  || None ||  ||  ||
|-
| Ellie ||  ||  ||  || Northern Territory, Western Australia ||  ||  ||
|-
|}

Other systems
Tropical Cyclone Pearl (1983) was declassified as a tropical cyclone during post-season analysis, after the BoM determined that it was unlikely to have become a tropical cyclone as a result of the strong wind shear over the area.

Tropical Cyclones Isobel (2006), Odette (2008), Fletcher (2014) were declassified as a tropical cyclone during post-season analysis, after the BoM determined that the system had not reached tropical cyclone intensity.

Tropical Cyclone's Ken (2004) Gabrielle (2009), Anggrek (2010) were declassified as tropical cyclones during post-season analysis, after the BoM estimated that gale force winds did not extend more than 1/2 way around the centre.

Tropical Cyclone Peta was declassified as a Category 1 tropical cyclone during post-season analysis, after the BoM estimated that gale force winds did not extend more than 1/2 way around the centre for more than 6 hours.

Tropical Cyclone Usha was named as a tropical cyclone by the Papua New Guinea National Weather Service, however, it is not currently recorded in the Australian Bureau of Meteorology's tropical cyclone database.

Climatology

Notes

See also
List of Category 1 Atlantic hurricanes
List of Category 1 Pacific hurricanes

References

External links

Australian